HMS Armada was a  of the Royal Navy (RN). She was named in honour of the English victory over the Spanish Armada in 1588. Armada was built by Hawthorn Leslie and Company on the Tyne. She was launched on 9 December 1943 and commissioned on 2 July 1945.

Royal Navy service
In 1945, Armada joined the British Pacific Fleet but did not see action during the Second World War. The following year, as part of the 19th Destroyer Flotilla, Armada deployed to the Far East, performing a variety of duties while based there, and the following year, Armada, with the rest of the 19th Flotilla, returned home to the UK, visiting a variety of ports on the way, mainly on 'fly-the-flag' visits. Upon reaching the UK, Armada was placed in Reserve. In 1949, Armada joined the 3rd Destroyer Flotilla, deploying to the Mediterranean as part of that flotilla.

In 1950, Armada, while still based in the Mediterranean, was involved in a collision. Armada remained in the sunny climes of the Mediterranean until returning home to the UK with the rest of the 3rd Destroyer Flotilla. In 1956, Armada was in the area during the Suez Crisis in 1956, which took place in response to the Egyptian President Nasser's nationalisation of the Suez Canal.  She subsequently returned to home waters when she, now Captain (D) of the 3rd Destroyer Flotilla, meaning that she was the leader of the flotilla, joined the Home Fleet.
In June, 1958 Armada provided escort for the Royal Yacht whilst the Queen visited North East England. Following this she steamed anti clockwise around Scotland and proceeded into the Mediterranean and then onto to the conflict in Cyprus patrolling up and down the west coast to prevent arms smuggling.

Decommissioning and fate
In 1960, Armada was decommissioned, and in 1965, she was sold to Thos. W. Ward for scrapping at Inverkeithing.

References

Publications
 
 

 

Battle-class destroyers of the Royal Navy
Ships built on the River Tyne
1943 ships
World War II destroyers of the United Kingdom
Cold War destroyers of the United Kingdom